The fifteenth season of the American reality television series The Real Housewives of Orange County premiered on October 14, 2020, on Bravo and concluded on January 27, 2021. It is primarily filmed in Orange County, California. Its executive producers are Adam Karpel, Alex Baskin, Douglas Ross, Gregory Stewart, Scott Dunlop, Stephanie Boyriven and Andy Cohen.

The Real Housewives of Orange County focuses on the lives of Shannon Storms Beador, Kelly Dodd-Leventhal, Gina Kirschenheiter, Emily Simpson, Braunwyn Windham-Burke and Elizabeth Lyn Vargas.

This season marked the final appearances of Dodd-Leventhal, Windham-Burke, and Vargas after announcing their departures in June, 2021.

Production and crew
Douglas Ross, Alex Baskin, Thomas Kelly, Brian McCarthy, Megan Sanchez-Warner, Scott Dunlop and Andy Cohen are recognized as the series' executive producers; it is produced and distributed by Evolution Media.

In January 2020, Vicki Gunvalson and Tamra Judge announced their departures from the series. Judge was previously offered to return to the series for three episodes to wrap up her storylines but instead decided to depart the series. Shannon Storms Beador, Kelly Dodd-Leventhal, Gina Kirschenheiter, Emily Simpson and Braunwyn Windham-Burke returned, with Elizabeth Lyn Vargas joining as a new cast member.

Production on the series was halted in March 2020, due to the COVID-19 pandemic in the United States. While production was halted, the cast filmed themselves. Production on the series resumed in July 2020. That same month, Storms Beador announced she and her three daughters had tested positive for COVID-19, with the series remaining in production. In August of the same year, Storms Beador announced she had recovered and tested negative for the virus.

Former housewife Jeana Keough served as narrator in the opening of the first episode.

Cast
Tamra Judge exited the series after 13 years on the cast. Elizabeth Lyn Vargas filled in as Judge's replacement.

 Due to COVID-19 protocols, the Housewives are seated in separate seats rather than the usual couches.

Episodes

References

External links

 
 
 

2020 American television seasons
2021 American television seasons
Television productions postponed due to the COVID-19 pandemic
Orange County (season 15)